Thomas Mallon (born November 2, 1951) is an American novelist, essayist, and critic.  His novels are renowned for their attention to historical detail and context and for the author's crisp wit and interest in the "bystanders" to larger historical events.  He is the author of ten books of fiction, including Henry and Clara, Two Moons, Dewey Defeats Truman, Aurora 7, Bandbox, Fellow Travelers, Watergate, Finale, Landfall, and most recently Up With the Sun.  He has also published nonfiction on plagiarism (Stolen Words), diaries (A Book of One's Own), letters (Yours Ever) and the Kennedy assassination (Mrs. Paine's Garage), as well as two volumes of essays (Rockets and Rodeos and In Fact).

He is a former literary editor of Gentleman's Quarterly, where he wrote the "Doubting Thomas" column in the 1990s, and has contributed frequently to The New Yorker, The New York Times Book Review, The Atlantic Monthly, The American Scholar, and other periodicals. He was appointed a member of the National Council on the Humanities in 2002 and served as Deputy Chairman of the National Endowment for the Humanities from 2005 to 2006.

His honors include Guggenheim and Rockefeller fellowships, the National Book Critics Circle citation for reviewing, and the Vursell prize of the American Academy of Arts and Letters for distinguished prose style.  He was elected as a new member of the American Academy of Arts and Sciences in 2012.

Early life and education

Thomas Vincent Mallon was born in Glen Cove, New York and grew up in Stewart Manor, N.Y., on Long Island.  His father, Arthur Mallon, was a salesman and his mother, Caroline, kept the home.  Mallon graduated from Sewanhaka High School in 1969.  He has often said that he had "the kind of happy childhood that is so damaging to a writer."

Mallon went on to study English at Brown University, where he wrote his undergraduate honors thesis on American author Mary McCarthy.  He credits McCarthy, with whom he later became friends, as the most enduring influence on his career as a writer.

Mallon earned a Master of Arts and a Ph.D. from Harvard University, where he wrote his dissertation on the English World War I poet Edmund Blunden.  On sabbatical from Vassar College in 1982–1983, Mallon spent a year as a visiting scholar at St. Edmund's House (later College) at Cambridge University.  It was here that he drafted most of A Book of One's Own, a work of nonfiction about diarists and diary-writing.  The book's rather unexpected success earned Mallon tenure at Vassar College, where he taught English from 1979 to 1991.

Writing career

Thomas Mallon's writing style is characterized by wit, charm and a meticulous attention to detail and character development.  His nonfiction often explores "fringe" genres—diaries, letters, plagiarism—just as his fiction frequently tells the stories of characters "on the fringes of big events."

A Book of One's Own, an informal guide to the great diaries of literature, was published in 1984 and gave Mallon his first dose of critical acclaim.  Richard Eder, writing in the Los Angeles Times (28 November 1984) called the book "an engaging meditation on the varied and irrepressible spirit of life that insists on preserving itself on paper."  In A Book of One's Own, Mallon covers a wide range of diarists from Samuel Pepys to Anais Nin.  He explained his enthusiasm for the genre by saying: "Writing books is too good an idea to be left to authors."   The success of A Book of One's Own won Mallon a Rockefeller Fellowship in 1986.

Mallon then began publishing 
fiction, a genre in which he'd informally dabbled throughout childhood and young adulthood.  Mallon published his first novel, Arts and Sciences, in 1988 about Arthur Dunne, a 22-year-old Harvard graduate student in English.  Soon after its publication, in 1989, Mallon released a second nonfiction book called Stolen Words: Forays Into the Origins and Ravages of Plagiarism.

Henry and Clara, published in 1994, established Mallon as a writer of historical fiction from that point forward.  The novel traces the lives of Major Henry Rathbone and Clara Harris, the young couple who accompanied Abraham Lincoln to Ford's Theatre on April 14, 1865.  A story of star-crossed lovers intermingles with personal and political tragedies and spans the couple's first meeting in childhood to their eventual derangement.  Mallon's writing career took a dramatic turn when John Updike praised Henry and Clara in The New Yorker, calling Mallon "one of the most interesting American novelists at work."

Historical fiction, Mallon has declared in interviews, is the genre in which he is most interested as a writer.  "I think the main thing that has led me to write historical fiction is that it is a relief from the self," he explains.  American political history has been perhaps his main subject and interest; in 1994, he was the ghostwriter of former Vice President Dan Quayle's memoir, Standing Firm.

After the publication of Henry and Clara, Mallon went on to write seven more works of historical fiction, including his most recent novels, Watergate (2012), Finale (2015), and Landfall (2019).  Watergate, a finalist for the 2013 PEN/Faulkner Award for Fiction, is a retelling of the Watergate scandal from the perspective of seven characters, some familiar to the public memory, such as Nixon's secretary Rose Mary Woods, and some brought to light from the sidelines of the scandal, such as Fred LaRue.  Finale: A Novel of the Reagan Years, one of the New York Times'''  100 Notable Books of 2015, takes readers to the political gridiron of Washington in 1986; the wealthiest enclaves of southern California; and the volcanic landscape of Iceland, where President Ronald Reagan engages in two almost apocalyptic days of negotiation with Mikhail Gorbachev. Readers of Finale find themselves in the shoes of many characters both central and peripheral to the Reagan presidency––from Nancy Reagan to Richard Nixon to actress Bette Davis.Landfall, Mallon's 2019 novel, takes place during the George W. Bush years against a backdrop of political catastrophe: the Iraq insurgency and Hurricane Katrina, in particular. At the center of the narrative, though, is a love affair between two West Texans, Ross Weatherall and Allison O'Connor, whose destinies have been intertwined with Bush's for decades.

Awards and nominations

 Phi Beta Kappa, 1972
 Rockefeller Fellowship, 1986–87
 Ingram Merrill Award (for outstanding work as a writer), 1994
 Great Lakes Book Award for Fiction, 1998, for Dewey Defeats Truman National Book Critics Circle Award (Nona Balakian Citation) for Excellence in Reviewing, 1998
 Guggenheim Fellowship, 2000–2001
 Dictionary of Literary Biography Award for Distinguished Criticism, 2002
 Finalist for 2007 Lambda Literary Award for Fellow Travelers American Academy of Arts and Letters' Harold D. Vursell Memorial Award for prose style ($10,000 prize; conferred May 2011)
 Elected to American Academy of Arts and Sciences, 2012
 Finalist, PEN/Faulkner Award for Fiction (For Watergate, 2013)

Later life

Openly gay, Mallon currently lives with his longtime partner, William Bodenschatz, in Washington, DC, and is a professor emeritus of English at The George Washington University. He once described himself as a "supposed literary intellectual/homosexual/Republican." During the 2016 election he was actively involved in "Scholars and Writers Against Trump," a group of disaffected conservatives. He left the Republican Party in November 2016.

 See also 
List of historical novelists

Bibliography
 

Books
Nonfiction
 
 
 
 
 
 
 

Fiction
 
 
 
 
 
 
 
 
 
 
 

Essays and reporting
 
 
 
 
 
 
"Presumptive". The Critics. Life and Letters. The New Yorker. October 31, 2016.
“Jack Be Nimble: Trying to Remember JFK.” The Critics. Life and Letters. The New Yorker, May 22, 2017.
 

Critical studies and reviews of Mallon's work

  Review of A Book of One's Own.
  Review of Stolen words.
  Review of Aurora 7.
  Review of Rockets and rodeos and other American spectacles.
  Review of Henry and Clara.
  Review of Dewey defeats Truman.
  Review of Dewey defeats Truman.
  Review of Two Moons.
  Review of In fact : essays on writers and writing.
  Review of Mrs. Paine's Garage and the murder of John F. Kennedy.
  Review of Bandbox.
  Review of Fellow Travelers.
  Survey of Mallon’s career up to 2008.
  Review of Yours Ever.
 
 
Andersen, Kurt (February 11, 2019). "A Comic Novel About the George W. Bush No One Knows". The New York Times. Review of Landfall.
Swaim, Barton (February 15, 2019). "‘Landfall’ Review: How It Really Never Happened." The Wall Street Journal. Review of Landfall.

Interviews
 
 
 
 
 
 
Smith, Evan (October 8, 2015). "Thomas Mallon." Overheard with Evan Smith.
Akst, Daniel (March 1, 2019). "Fictionalizing History, With Republicans at Center Stage". The Wall Street Journal''.

References

External links 

 Thomas Mallon's Website
 Mostly Fiction Review of Bandbox
 Thomas Mallon: "Watergate: A Novel"
    
 "Two Moons" by Thomas Mallon

1951 births
Living people
Brown University alumni
Harvard University alumni
Vassar College faculty
George Washington University faculty
20th-century American novelists
21st-century American novelists
American historical novelists
American male novelists
Rockefeller Fellows
Writers from Glen Cove, New York
American gay writers
Fellows of the American Academy of Arts and Sciences
American LGBT novelists
The New Yorker people
PEN/Faulkner Award for Fiction winners
Novelists from New York (state)
20th-century American male writers
21st-century American male writers